Gøtugjógv, Norðragøta and Syðrugøta are villages that are located in the Faroe Islands. These areas are located at the end of an inlet which is called 'Gøtuvík'.  This is on the east side of the island of Eysturoy.

A new church has been built near Gøtugjógv, and inside it has huge stained glass windows made by the artist Tróndur Patursson from Kirkjubøur. The church turned out to be two times more expensive than originally planned.

From 1980 until 1989 there was an upper secondary school in Gøtugjógv.

See also
 List of towns in the Faroe Islands

References

External links

Faroeislands.dk: Gøtugjógv Images and description of all cities on the Faroe Islands.

Populated places in the Faroe Islands